Park Jeong-hwa (born May 8, 1995), also known mononymously as Jeonghwa, is a South Korean singer and actress. She is best known as a member of EXID.

Biography 
Park Jeong-hwa was born on May 8, 1995, in Anyang, Gyeonggi, South Korea. She was a JYP Entertainment trainee before joining Yedang Entertainment.

EXID 

Park made her musical debut as a member of EXID on February 15, 2012, with the release of their debut single, "Whoz That Girl".

As actress 
Park made her acting debut as a child actress in a bit part in Wives on Strike (2004). In 2005, she became a co-host of NATV's Freshful Children Congress.

In 2015, she became a cast member in the variety television show Soulmates Returns. In the same year, she portrayed Yook Ah-young in the drama Webtoon Hero Toondra Show as her first major leading role. She also appeared in several music videos such as Wonder Girls' "Tell Me" (2007), Huh Gak and LE's "Whenever You Play That Song" (2011), I-Rex's "That You're My Girl" (2013), RK Kim Seong-hui's "10:10" and "You Are My Everything" (2014).

On October 9, 2018, it was confirmed that Park would be cast in web drama Member of Society, and it is set to air in 2019.

On October 11, 2019, it was confirmed that Park signed on with J-Wide Company to pursue her acting career. In 2021, she appeared in an SBS hit drama One the Woman. She portrayed Park So-yi, a news anchor who is also mistress of Kang Mina's (portrayed by Lee Hanee) husband.

Discography

Filmography

Television series

Web dramas

Variety shows

References

External links

1995 births
Living people
EXID members
K-pop singers
South Korean female idols
South Korean women pop singers
South Korean television actresses
South Korean dance musicians
South Korean television presenters
South Korean women television presenters
Mandarin-language singers of South Korea
People from Anyang, Gyeonggi